"Golem" is a 1998 comical short story written by Korean author Lee Yeongdo based on the world of his novel Dragon Raja. It is a part of a series of short stories Yeongdo wrote known as "Sceneries Of Laboratory." The story portrays and questions human-based borders and limits and their meaning through an artificially created being named Golem.

References 

1998 short stories
Fantasy short stories
Golem
Works by Lee Yeongdo
South Korean literature
Korean short stories